The Gmail interface makes Gmail unique amongst webmail systems for several reasons. Most evident to users are its search-oriented features and means of managing e-mail in a "conversation view" that is similar to an Internet forum.

An official redesign of the Gmail interface was rolled out on November 1, 2011 that simplified the look and feel of Gmail into a more minimalist design to provide a more consistent look throughout Google products and services as part of an overall design change. Another major redesign took place April 2018 which introduced new information rights management controls designed for business use cases.

Programming 
Gmail makes use of Ajax, employing browser features such as JavaScript, keyboard access keys and Web feed integration.

Organization

Advanced search
Gmail allows users to conduct advanced searches using either the Advanced Search interface or through search operators in the search box. Emails can be searched by their text; by their ‘From’, ‘To’ and ‘Subject’ fields, by their location, date and size; by associated labels, categories and circles, by whether or not the message is read, and by whether or not the message has an attachment. There are also a large number of advanced search operators. By default, Gmail combines search terms with an invisible “AND”. Gmail allows the use of Boolean operators such as “OR” for finding messages that match at least one of the more search terms.

Filters
Gmail allows users to create rules (‘filters’) for the automatic organization of incoming mail. Filters are created using the Advanced Search interface using the same criteria as those used for searching. Gmail can perform any combination of the following actions upon an email that meets all the specified criteria in a filter:
 archiving (i.e. removing the message from the Inbox)
 adding a star
 marking as read
 marking as important 
 applying a label
 moving to the bin
 forwarding to another e-mail address

Labels
Labels provide a flexible method of organizing emails since an email can have any number of labels (in contrast to a folder-based system in which an email can belong to only one folder). Labels are much like tags on a blog post. Labels can also do the work of folders if an email is moved to a label – this is the equivalent of applying a label to it as well as archiving it. By default, labels appear on the message list and can be customized with a color. Users can also create sub-labels beneath a label to create a hierarchy or nested labels. Labels can be used as a search criterion and all emails having a particular label can be viewed together through the side menu. Gmail has often received praise for replacing the limitations of hierarchical folders with the flexibility of labels.

Archiving
Gmail allows users to 'archive' emails. Archiving removes a conversation from the inbox and can be accessed via the 'All Mail' section. In Gmail, the 'All Mail' section displays all of a user's emails, excluding the ones in Spam and Bin. Technically, when a message is archived, the 'Inbox' label is removed from it. Archiving presents a better alternative to deleting as it helps to tidy up the inbox without deleting messages permanently. Archiving, however, is limited to message threads and individual messages cannot be archived. Moreover, archiving is available only for the inbox, and messages in other places such as Sent Mail cannot be archived. However, according to About.com, this limitation can be overcome by accessing Gmail through IMAP. Archiving is unique to Gmail and is not offered by any other major webmail service or email client.

Importance markers
Marking of emails as important is more or less automatic. Users can ‘train’ Gmail in recognizing important messages by manually marking messages as important. Gmail takes into account a number of signals to determine whether a message is important or not. Messages from people who are emailed to or replied to a lot, and messages of the type that are always opened or were recently marked as important or starred, are likely to be marked as important automatically. Also, messages that are sent to a user directly and not through a mailing list, and messages containing certain keywords (password change, transaction details, shipment delivery, ticket confirmation, etc.) are marked as important. Messages of the type that were recently archived or deleted, or are rarely opened are less likely to be marked as important. Important emails can be searched for using the operator “is:important”. Uninterested users have the option to turn off the entire feature.

In September 2010, Google introduced the ‘priority inbox’ which makes use of important markers. Priority Inbox splits up the inbox into sections such as “Important and unread”, “Unread”, “Starred” and “Everything else” enabling a user to always see important items on the top. It is an opt-in feature.

In a review for Lifehacker, Adam Pash writes that Gmail is only as good at recognizing important emails as any context-ignorant computer can be. However, in another review for Lifehacker, Whitson Gordon calls Priority Inbox "one of Gmail’s most unsung features". He writes that Priority Inbox can be quite helpful as long as users give it a chance to learn from their habits.

Inbox tabs and category labels
Beginning June 2013, Gmail allowed for the usage of tabs in the inbox for automatically categorizing emails by five general categories:

 Primary (Person-to-person email conversations)
 Social (from social networks, online dating services and media-sharing sites)
 Promotions (solicitations, marketing and one-way mailing lists)
 Updates (confirmations, receipts, bills and updates)
 Forums (discussion threads from forum boards)

Users have the choice to hide one or more of the tabs or disable the entire feature. These tabs also appear in Gmail's Android and iOS apps.

Even if the use of tabs is switched off, all emails are sorted into one of the five categories, which can be used as automatic labels. Like labels, categories can be used as a search criterion and be made to appear as labels on the message list. All emails with a particular category can be seen together through the side menu.

Sorting
Unlike other email web clients, Gmail does not permit users to see the size of an email message or to sort email (for example, alphabetically by subject).

Conversation view 
Gmail recognizes messages related by subject and groups them into "conversations" where messages in a back-and-forth string get collected together and appear stacked one after another, with the newest messages at the top. Any duplicated text is automatically concealed. The number of messages in a conversation always appears in parentheses next to the names of people in the conversation. A conversation will break off into a new thread if the subject line of a message is changed, or if the conversation reaches over 100 messages. Replied or forwarded messages from some local (like local Yahoo! Mail) accounts also split up conversations because their subjects contain parameters in the local language, instead of "Re" or "Fwd:".

User response to conversation view was mixed. Due to reduced control over individual messages, many users were vocal in expressing their dissatisfaction. On September 29, 2010, Google added the option of disabling conversation view in the Gmail web app. Google software engineer Doug Che explained: "We really hoped everyone would learn to love conversation view, but we came to realize that it's just not right for some people." Conversation view is still enabled automatically in mobile apps, which remains a source of user frustration.

Contacts 
Gmail automatically saves contact details when forwarding e-mails to a previously unknown recipient. If the user changes, adds, or removes information near an e-mail such as the name while sending any e-mail, it also updates that in the contact list, unless the user is using basic HTML view, designed for people with slower internet connections or browsers that do not support AJAX. When a user starts typing in the To, CC or BCC fields it brings up a list with the relevant contacts, with their name and primary e-mail address. More information, including alternate email addresses, can be added on the Contacts page. These contacts can also be added to a group, which makes sending multiple e-mails to related contacts easier. Images can be added to contacts, which will appear whenever the mouse is over the contact's name.

Users can import contacts (in several different ways) from Microsoft Office Outlook, Mozilla Thunderbird, Eudora, Hotmail, Yahoo! Mail, orkut, and any other contact list in a CSV-format file. Gmail also allows a user to export their contacts to CSV.

Gmail allows the importation of Google+ social media contacts, although as of 2018 Google+ is being discontinued.

Composition 
A year after Gmail was announced, Google introduced Rich Text Formatting, which allows the font size, color and text-alignment to be customized, as well as the embedding of bullet points and numbered lists.

Gmail also features Autosave — a system for avoiding loss of data in case of a browser crash or other error. During the composition of an e-mail, Gmail automatically saves a draft copy of the message and of any attachments. Although messages begin to be saved once a minute, saving times vary depending on the size of the message. Draft messages that are discarded are not recoverable.

Gmail places the cursor above quoted text when replying, which encourages top-posting. Regardless of the formatting of received messages, Gmail's conversation view defaults to showing only unique content, in chronological order.

The 'Smart Compose' tool was introduced by Google in May 2018. It uses AI to guess what is going to be written, even before it is typed. It bases some of this on the recipient and email's subject, as well as the user's past writing habits. For example, if the subject reads, "Dinner plans",then Smart Compose will take that into account as the user begins typing and it suggests normal wording for arranging a meal. Smart Compose helps save time by cutting back on repetitive writing, while reducing the chance of spelling and grammatical errors.

Attachments 
Individual Gmail messages including attachments may be up to 25 MB in size. However, users can send files of up to 15 GB in size through Google Drive. Effectively, the files are stored on Google Drive and only links to them are sent. This means that the recipients can access the file only if it is shared with them on Google Drive. Gmail notifies the user if the file being sent is not shared with the recipient and allows the user to modify the sharing settings before sending the file. The files can either be made accessible to anyone with the link, or shared privately with the email recipients. The latter does not work if the recipients do not have a Google account or if the email address receiving the message is not associated with Google.

Starting in December 2014, files in Google Drive can also be sent from Gmail as attachments rather than links, thus providing recipients access to the files even if they are later deleted from the sender's Drive.

In Gmail, attachments in supported formats are previewed as thumbnails within the message itself and clicking on the thumbnail opens up a full-screen view of the image or document through which users can browse through multiple attachments. Attachments can be downloaded to the hard disk or to a folder on Google Drive, or to Google+ Photos in case of image files.

The Gmail interface supports drag and drop of attachments to and from the inbox. Users can add an attachment by dragging it into the mail window. Similarly an attachment can be downloaded by dragging the attachment from the message to the desktop.

Addresses
Gmail supports plus-addressing of e-mails. This allows users to sign up for different services with different aliases and then easily filter all e-mails from those services. In addition, if users receive spam messages directed to an e-mail address with the extra text, they will know what services have leaked out their e-mail address. However, some websites do not accept email addresses containing "+", even though the mail-address specification permits use of them.

Additionally, Gmail does not recognize dots (periods) as characters within a username. Adding or removing dots from a Gmail address does not change the actual destination address. This too can help in setting up filters for incoming mail. It is also not necessary to include any of dots used during the creation of the account while signing in. However, this does not work in Google Apps for Your Domain. In Apps, each username variation must be entered as a nickname by the domain administrator.

Gmail allows the user to add other email accounts to be used as optional sender addresses on outgoing email. The system carries out a verification process to confirm the user's ownership of each email address before it is added. "Plus-addresses" can also be added as sender addresses in a similar way. Any of the additional addresses can be set as the default address. Optionally, users can set a different "reply-to" address for each "send as" address.

When using this feature, the address chosen will appear in the "From:" field of the message header. However, the SMTP envelope sender address will contain the name of the Gmail account used to send the message. Thus the underlying Gmail account address remains readily available: it will typically appear in a "Sender:" header field, or occasionally in the subject field. Some mail clients will write "From: Sender@gmail.com [mailto:Sender@gmail.com] On Behalf Of..." upon reply, making the situation very obvious.

Gmail does now allow users to specify a 3rd party SMTP server. Gmail can use this to send outgoing email for that particular account avoiding the masked account problem.

Information Rights Management 

The 2018 redesign introduced information rights management controls intended to give the sender the ability to "remove the option to forward, copy, download or print messages." To achieve this, Google hosts the content of the message on their own servers and only includes a link to the hosted content within the main body of the email, which (non-Gmail) users must click to open the message in their web browser. The feature is only effective against accidental copying, as the user can still take a screenshot or override the print and copy protections entirely by using the developer tools in their web browser.

Confidential Mode 

The 2018 redesign introduced a "confidential mode" that builds upon the information rights management features to allow the sender to later revoke the receiver's access to a message, or to automatically revoke the receiver's access after a prespecified time period (dubbed "self-destructing emails" by the media).

Mail fetcher 
In addition to adding extra email addresses, Gmail has a feature called "Mail Fetcher" that allows users to add up to five additional accounts to retrieve mail from via POP3. Once accounts are added, the program asks the user if they want to create a custom sender address automatically if they have not yet done so manually. This feature does not support retrieving mail from IMAP servers.

Product integration

Google Talk, Google's service for instant messaging, can be accessed through a web-based interface on Gmail's site. The web-based interface is able to support voice and video calling and voice messages if the Google Talk client is running in the background. All messages are archived to the Chats mailbox in Gmail unless 'Off the Record' is enabled in Google Talk. If the fellow chatter suddenly has to go offline, any and all further messages sent will be delivered to that person via e-mail, including the entire conversation had previously. Another Google Talk integration feature is voicemail, where the message is sent to the recipient's Gmail inbox; as well as synchronizing contact pictures. On December 4, 2007, Google announced integration with AOL Instant Messenger (AIM), allowing Gmail users to log into their AIM accounts and send instant messages to and see the online status of AIM users.

On November 11, 2008, Google announced video chat, which Gmail integrates into its web-based client. Windows XP, Vista or Intel-based Mac is required with a supported browser (IE, Firefox, Chrome, Safari 3+).

Google Calendar offered Gmail integration soon after its announcement on April 13, 2006. Events can be added while writing a message that get stored on the main Calendar interface. Recipients who use Gmail will then receive an invitation to the event, which they can accept or decline. Furthermore, Gmail attempts to recognize event dates and locations within e-mails, and gives users the option to add the event to a calendar, similar to Microsoft's Exchange Server.

Gmail offers further integration with some other Google products. The integration with Google Drive enables users to share large files of up to 15 GB in size stored on Drive through Gmail, and to save email attachments directly to Google Drive. Attachments in supported formats are previewed within the message. Also, pictures can be sent directly from Picasa using a Gmail account.

Gmail also offered integration with its now-defunct social networking and messaging tool Google Buzz. With this feature, Gmail users could share links, photos, videos, status messages and comments organized in "conversations" and visible in the user's inbox.

Themes 

Google started offering users a choice of themes on November 19, 2008 with 31 different themes, ranging from the original light blue color to designs with image backgrounds and transparencies. Many of these themes are dynamic. Gmail uses the location provided by the user to correctly time theme changes with the local sunrise, sunset, or weather.

In June 2012, Gmail introduced custom themes, enabling users to set their own backgrounds. Users can either choose from a large number of 'featured' images, upload an image from the computer or phone, choose from Google+ albums, or add an image by URL. On April 2, 2014, Gmail added the ability to share custom themes via email or Google+, or through a public link.

Criticisms 

The conversation view groups related messages in a linear stack which a user can expand and collapse. Labelling (tagging) is limited to message threads.

Some users can experience difficulties when submitting e-mail addresses from the Gmail address book to the addressee line on the compose e-mail window. The "Autocomplete" feature can cause problems and does not work under all browsers or operating systems. However, it is possible to open the composed message in a new window so the address book can be opened, or another instance of Gmail can be opened in another window to access the address book. Gmail's current documented help on this issue states: "While Gmail doesn't currently support the functionality to open your Contacts list while composing a message, we're testing many new features to improve our service."

Although Gmail's advertisements have received praise for not obtruding, they can take up more space than Flash-based banners when up to six "sponsored links" appear next to an email. Additionally, when activated, opening emails makes the Web Clips RSS-feed bar display another sponsored link. Often the number of advertisements displayed in the Web Clips bar outnumbers the number of RSS feeds the user has requested. However, when a Gmail message is sent to another email address of a different provider, there will be no advertisements in the message unlike most other webmail providers.

When a Gmail mailbox reaches capacity, users can search for emails by size in order to delete the largest ones first. The web interface can help in this situation by searching for emails with attachments, but it does not indicate the sizes of those attachments.

See also 
 Gmail
 History of Gmail
 Comparison of webmail providers
 List of Google products
 Mailplane Gmail client for Mac OS X

References

External links

 Gmail

Gmail
Software features